Elections to Stirlingshire County Council were held on 10 May 1949, the same day as the other county councils in Scotland. The election saw Labour lose its majority, with no party gaining an overall majority.

Aggregate results

References 

1949
1949 Scottish local elections